Cengiz Demir (born 18 April 2001) is a Turkish footballer who plays as a defender for Uşakspor on loan from Hatayspor.

Career
Demir made his professional debut with Antalyaspor in a 4-3 Turkish Cup win over Göztepe S.K. on 16 January 2020.

References

External links
 
 Mackolik Profile

2001 births
21st-century Turkish people
Sportspeople from Gaziantep
Living people
Turkish footballers
Association football defenders
Antalyaspor footballers
Akhisarspor footballers
Hatayspor footballers
Kırklarelispor footballers
TFF Second League players